Jenkinstown is an unincorporated community in southern Surry County, North Carolina, United States, located  between Fairview and Crutchfield, which is sometimes known as Yokum.  The community is along Jenkinstown Road near U.S. Route 601.  Prominent landmarks include Mt. Pleasant Baptist Church.

Unincorporated communities in Surry County, North Carolina
Unincorporated communities in North Carolina